Attilio Bescapè (2 September 1910 – 1975) was an Italian weightlifter. He competed at the 1932 and 1936 Olympics in the featherweight class (−60 kg) and finished in fifth and sixth place, respectively. He won a silver medal at the 1938 World Weightlifting Championships.

References

1910 births
1975 deaths
Italian male weightlifters
Olympic weightlifters of Italy
People associated with physical culture
Weightlifters at the 1932 Summer Olympics
Weightlifters at the 1936 Summer Olympics
20th-century Italian people